Patrick Leduc (born December 26, 1977 in Saint-Lambert, Quebec) is a Canadian soccer player who formerly played for Montreal Impact in the USSF Division 2 Professional League.

Career

Youth and amateur
Before turning pro Leduc played amateur soccer with FC Sélect Rive-Sud in the Ligue de Soccer Elite Quebec. He also played for U15 and U17 Quebec select teams winning two silver medals, and later played for Twin Cities Tornado in the USL Premier Development League in 1998 and 1999.

Professional
Leduc was signed by Montreal Impact of the USL First Division in 2000, but in his first two seasons was a bit-player, featuring in only a handful of games. Leduc finally broke into the first team in 2002, and spent over 1,000 minutes on the field for the first time of his career with the Impact, picking up his first assists in a 3–1 win against the Pittsburgh Riverhounds on June 9. He also helped claim the Voyageurs Cup. In his fourth season with the club he scored his first goal, in an August 3 game against the Riverhounds. His second goal was the winner in 2–0 victory over Calgary Storm, which clinched first place in Eastern Conference. He was one of 11 Impact players to finish the season with over 1,500 minutes played.

In 2004 Leduc was one of five Impact players to play more than 2,000 minutes during the season, he scored three goals, and added more four assists. He was part of the starting eleven for the championship game, which the Impact won 2–0 against the Seattle Sounders, claiming the championship for the second time in club history, and for the third consecutive year helped claim the Voyageurs Cup.

In 2005 Leduc helped the Impact to a 15-game undefeated streak, setting a new league record, while helping the team clinch the regular season title. During the 2006 season he scored a goal against the Minnesota Thunder in a 4–0 victory, and layer played his 150th career game with the Impact on August 31 against Portland Timbers, becoming only the 7th player in club history to do so. Later in the season he reached the 10,000 career minutes played mark with Montreal - only the 8th person in club history.

On January 5, 2009 the Montreal Impact announced the re-signing of Leduc to a two-year contract for the 2009 season.

Leduc announced his retirement on March 29, 2011.

International
Leduc was invited to a Canada national soccer team training camp for the first time in In January 2005, and played his first game on July 2, 2005 against Honduras. He was selected to represent Canada at the 2005 CONCACAF Gold Cup, and was in the starting 11 for the first two games against Costa Rica and the United States, although both games resulted in a loss and Canada were knocked out of the tournament.

On January 22, 2006, he was selected for the international friendly against the United States in San Diego, but was an unused substitute in a 0–0 tie.

Post-retirement

Leduc is now a color commentator/analyst for broadcaster RDS, covering the Montreal Impact and international soccer.

Honors

Montreal impact
USL First Division Championship (2): 2004, 2009
USL First Division Commissioners Cup (2): 2005, 2006
Voyageurs Cup Champions (7): 2002, 2003, 2004, 2005, 2006, 2007, 2008

Career stats

Last update: September 5, 2010

1) Lamar Hunt U.S. Open Cup (American Based Clubs) – Nutrilite Canadian Cup (Canadian Based Clubs)
2) Concacaf Champions League

References

External links
Montreal Impact bio
 (archive)

1977 births
Living people
People from Saint-Lambert, Quebec
Francophone Quebec people
Association football midfielders
Soccer people from Quebec
Canadian soccer players
Canada men's international soccer players
Canadian expatriate soccer players
Canadian expatriate sportspeople in the United States
Twin Cities Phoenix players
Montreal Impact (1992–2011) players
USL First Division players
USL League Two players
USSF Division 2 Professional League players
Expatriate soccer players in the United States
2005 CONCACAF Gold Cup players
Player-coaches
FC Sélect Rive-Sud players